Kathryn Swink (born October 22, 1954) is an American film, stage, and television actress.

Career
Swink made her film debut in a minor role in the 1987 comedy Like Father Like Son, followed by a supporting part in Paul Schrader's biopic Patty Hearst (1988). She has worked primarily in television, including guest appearances on Star Trek: Deep Space Nine (1999), Judging Amy (2005), and Without a Trace (2006).

In addition to film and television, Swink has appeared in theater, including productions of Ladyhouse Blues in 2013 for the Andak Stage Company in Los Angeles, California.

Filmography

Film

Television

References

External links

1954 births
Living people
Actresses from Portland, Oregon
American stage actresses
21st-century American women